DRL may refer to:

Science and technology 
 Daytime running lamp
 Diode-resistor logic
 Driven right leg circuit
 Differential reinforcement of low response rate; see reinforcement

Sport 
 Deutscher Reichsbund für Leibesübungen, a Nazi German sports governing body
 Drone Racing League

Transportation 
 Derol railway station, in Gujarat, India
 Downtown Relief Line, a former proposed subway line in Toronto, Canada
 DRL Coachlines, a Canadian bus company

Other uses
 DRL (video game)
 Bureau of Democracy, Human Rights, and Labor of the United States Department of State
 David Rittenhouse Laboratory of the University of Pennsylvania
 Defence Research Laboratory of the Indian Defence Research and Development Organisation
 Dominion Rules Licence, a free content licence
 Paakantyi (Darling language)
 DRL Supply Co., a general store in Morrisonville, Illinois, U.S.